INI may refer to:

Computing
 INI file, a configuration file for computer applications
 Impact Nominal Index, a computer system to track and trace individuals during criminal investigations

Organizations
 Isaac Newton Institute (INI)
 Instituto Nacional de Industria (INI), Spanish industrial development organization
 Instituto Nacional Indigenista (INI), Mexico's (defunct) government agency for indigenous people
 INI Steel, a group by Hyundai Motor Company
 Inspiration Network International, a Christian TV channel in South Carolina, United States
 The first International Neuroscience Institute, in Hanover, Germany
 The third International Neuroscience Institute, in Tehran, Iran

People
 Ini Dima-Okojie, Nigerian actress
 Nyuserre Ini, pharaoh of the 5th Dynasty of Egypt, during the 25th century BCE, Old Kingdom
 Qakare Ini, pretender to the Egyptian throne during the 11th or 12th Dynasty
 Merhotepre Ini, pharaoh of the 13th Dynasty of Egypt during the Second Intermediate Period, c. 1675 BC
 Mershepsesre Ini II, pharaoh of the late 13th Dynasty of Egypt during the Second Intermediate Period, c. 1650 BC
 Menkheperre Ini, a king of the 23rd Dynasty of Egypt ruling over Thebes, during the Third Intermediate Period in the 8th century BC
King Ini of Wessex, more commonly called Ine of Wessex

Places
 INI, the IATA code of Niš Constantine the Great Airport in Serbia
 Ini, Iran (disambiguation)
 Ini, Akwa Ibom, an administrative division of Akwa Ibom State

Music
 INI (hip hop group)
 Ini Kamoze, a reggae artist
 INI (Japanese boy group)

Other
 According to Rastafari philosophy, "I-N-I" a.k.a."I-and-I" is the personification of one who lives by Rastafari ideals, or specifically how one chooses to view oneself.
 Ini (Stephen King), a term for an inter-dimensional portal in two books by author Stephen King, Desperation and The Regulators
 Institute of National Importance (INI), a status that may be conferred to a higher education institution in India by an act of parliament.

See also

 
 INIS (disambiguation)